Henoch may refer to:
 Henoch (journal), on the history of Judaism
 Henoch–Schönlein purpura, a vascular disease
 Henoch Leibowitz (1918–2008), Lithuanian-American rabbi
 Chanoch Henoch Bornsztain (died 1965), Polish rabbi
 Eduard Heinrich Henoch (1820–1910), German physician
 Lilli Henoch (1899–1942), German world record holder in the discus, shot put, and relay
 Maxim Litvinov (1876–1951), born Meir Henoch Mojszewicz Wallach-Finkelstein, Russian revolutionary and diplomat
 Henoch (fictional character), one of three incorporeal beings in the Star Trek episode "Return to Tomorrow"

See also
 Enoch (disambiguation)
 Hanoch (disambiguation)